Ossy Chinedu Prestige (24 January 1965 – 6 February 2021) was a Nigerian businessman and politician who served in the 8th House of Representatives.

Ossy Prestige was a member of the APGA and has served as the House of Representatives member for Aba North/Aba South Nigeria Federal constituency of Abia State since 2015.

Prestige was a member representing Aba North/Aba South federal constituency in the House of Representatives died on February 6, 2021, in Germany, at the age of 56.

Background 
Hon. Prestige Ossy hailed from the Agboji community of Abiriba in Ohafia L.G.A of Abia State. He held a B.Sc degree in Government and Public Administration from the Abia State University, Uturu, an MBA in Shipping and Logistics from the Lloyds Maritime Academy London, United Kingdom, and an Honorary Doctorate Degree in Public Administration from Commonwealth University in Belize, South America amongst other academic qualifications.

Career 
Hon. Prestige Ossy was a seasoned customs broker, maritime services provider, shipping consultant and importer of diverse merchandise. His business has been so diversified that it transverses all sectors of Nigerian economy making him a major employer of labour.

He was the treasurer of the Association of Nigerian Licensed Customs Agents (ANLCA), Onne Sea Port Chapter, 2002, its Secretary 2003 – 2008 and Chairman 2008 – 2014. He was the 1st Deputy President of the Aba Chamber of Commerce, Industry, Mines and Agriculture (NACCIMA).

Hon. Rtn. Prestige Ossy was an Elite member of the Rotary International, renowned for his Global Humanitarian outreach and has risen to become a Privileged 2nd Level Major Donor of the organization having donated well over Twenty Five Thousand U.S. Dollars ($25,000) to the cause of charity.

He was President of the Rotary Club of Eziukwu Aba 2007/2008 and Assistant Governor of Rotary District 9140, 2009/2010. He was a sports enthusiast and promoter, and a Hall of Fame Silver Card Holder of the prestigious Aba Sports Club.

Charity 
Honourable Ossy Prestige ran two foundations of which he was President: 
 Prestige Ossy Foundation (President)
 The Favoured Initiatives (President)

Constituency Projects 

As part of his 2016 constituency project, Hon. Prestige distributed "keke-napepe", motor cycles, electricity generating sets, grinding machines, sewing machines, hairdressing dryers etc. to the people of his Federal Constituency.

In 2017, Hon. Ossy Prestige and the Federal Government National Directorate of Employment gave the unemployed young men and women from his Federal Constituency of Aba North and South skills acquisition training to create employment for themselves and others.

The two phase training was on Catering/Confectionery, Cosmetology and Basic Business Training (BBT) otherwise known as Entrepreneurship.

Personal life 
Prestige was married to Rotary Ann Precious and the union was blessed with five children. He was a Christian and member of the Presbyterian Church denomination.

References 

1965 births
2021 deaths
Abia State politicians
Abia State University alumni
All Progressives Grand Alliance politicians
Members of the House of Representatives (Nigeria)
Customs brokers